Nikola Vasilev Avramov (21 May 1897 – 15 June 1945) was a Bulgarian painter. He was born on 21 May 1897 in Yambol and died on 15 June 1945 in Sofia.

Avramov is known for his still-life paintings.

Gallery

References

External links

1897 births
1945 deaths
People from Yambol
20th-century Bulgarian painters
20th-century Bulgarian male artists
Male painters